Andrew Dow (January 2, 1892 – 1970) was an American football player and coach. He served as the head football coach at the University of Omaha—now known as the University of Nebraska at Omaha—from 1913 to 1914, compiling a record of 0–7. He later worked as a pediatrician in Omaha.

Head coaching record

References

External links
 

1892 births
1970 deaths
Nebraska–Omaha Mavericks football coaches
Nebraska–Omaha Mavericks football players